George Timothy Pearson (21 July 1921 – 24 July 1983) was an English first-class cricketer.

Pearson was born at Kensington and was educated at the Radley College. He later played first-class cricket for the Free Foresters in two matches. The first of these came in 1948 against Oxford University at Oxford, while the second came over a decade later against Cambridge University at Cambridge in 1959. He scored a total of 54 runs in these matches, with a high score of 28.

He died in July 1983 at Cuxham, Oxfordshire.

References

External links

1921 births
1983 deaths
Sportspeople from Kensington
People educated at Radley College
English cricketers
Free Foresters cricketers